Nia Caron is a Welsh television actress. She is known for playing Anita Pierce in the long running soap Pobol y Cwm since 1999.

Early and personal life
Caron grew up in Llwyn y Groes near Tregaron, Ceredigion. She is the daughter of the artist Ogwyn Davies.

Caron is married to the musician Geraint Jarman. The two met while acting on the Welsh series Glas y Dorlan. They have two daughters, Hanna and Mared Jarman, and live in Cardiff. Their youngest daughter, Mared is living with Stargardt disease.

Filmography

Television

References

External links
 

Welsh-speaking actors
Welsh television actresses
Living people
Year of birth missing (living people)